Tillaikhombee (English: Caterpillar, also written as Tillaikhombi) is a 2010 Indian Meitei language film directed by Khwairakpam Bishwamittra and produced by Jiri Budha under the banner of Ningshing Mami Production, Jiribam. It stars Raju Nong, Huirem Seema, Nillachandra and Sonia Hijam in the lead roles. The movie was premiered as a press show at Cinema Paradiso, Thangal Bazar on 9 April 2010. It was later released at Pratap Talkies, Paona Bazar and many other theatres of Manipur in 2010.

The film bagged two awards at the 1st MANIFA 2012 organised by Sahitya Seva Samiti, Kakching.

Synopsis
The film is about love, hatred, corruption, competition for power and revenge. Yaiphaba and Lemba become victims to the trap set up by ill-minded Keirenjao. He befriends politicians, police and militants to enable him to execute illegal works successfully. In sharp contrast, Memthoi (Keirenjao's daughter) loves Nungshiba (Yaiphaba's adopted son). With the passage of time, the rule of karma plays out and Keirenjao gets killed.

Cast
 Raju Nong as Yaiphaba
 Huirem Seema as Likla
 Nillachandra as Nungshiba, Yaiphaba's adopted son
 Sonia Hijam as Memthoi, Keirenjao's daughter
 Lairenjam Olen as Lemba
 Prafullo Chandra as Keirenjao
 Gurumayum Priyogopal as Minister
 Philem Puneshori as Keirenjao's wife
 Homeshwori as Minister's wife
 Longjam Ongbi Lalitabi as Yaiphaba's mother
 Lingjelthoibi as Lemba's wife
 Geetchandra Chongtham as Thoiren
 Momoko Khangembam as Tombi, Memthoi's friend
 Bimola as School Principal
 Surjit Saikhom
 Khekman Ratan
 Irom Shyamkishore

Accolades
Tillaikhombee won two awards out of the 8 nominations at the 1st Sahitya Seva Samiti MANIFA held in 2012. Raju Nong and Bishwamittra won the Best Actor in a Leading Role - Male and Best Direction awards respectively.

Soundtrack
O. Geet composed the soundtrack for the film and Khaidem Imo and Ranjit Ningthouja wrote the lyrics. The songs are titled Nangsu Chatlu Nanggi Maikeida and Sajibu Kalen Inga Ingen.

References

2010s Meitei-language films
2010 films
Cinema of Manipur